Roger Ludwig (16 January 1933 – 11 April 2009) was a Luxembourgian cyclist. He competed in the individual and team road race events at the 1952 Summer Olympics.

References

External links
 

1933 births
2009 deaths
Luxembourgian male cyclists
Olympic cyclists of Luxembourg
Cyclists at the 1952 Summer Olympics
Place of birth missing